is a Japanese footballer currently playing as a midfielder for Elbasani.

Career statistics

Club
.

Notes

References

1999 births
Living people
Japanese footballers
Japanese expatriate footballers
Association football midfielders
Kategoria e Parë players
KF Elbasani players
Japanese expatriate sportspeople in Albania
Expatriate footballers in Albania